David James Hayden, MC (born  1979) is the first Royal Air Force non-commissioned officer to win the Military Cross.

Early life
Hayden was born in Germany and attended the Gleed Boys' School in Spalding, where he grew up. His father (who died in June 2005, aged 49) was a tank driver in the Queen's Royal Hussars, becoming a warrant officer class 2.

RAF service
Hayden joined the RAF Regiment in 1997 and after a number of tours including time with No. 2 RAF Force Protection Wing at RAF Leeming – with which he served in Afghanistan for the first time – he is currently a sergeant. He is a qualified instructor.

While serving in Iraq in 2007, as part of No. 4 RAF Force Protection Wing (of which 1 Squadron is a sub-unit), he showed outstanding courage while commanding a dismounted patrol in a fight against an insurgent force, repeatedly risking his own life to rescue a wounded comrade and extract his team. His Military Cross was gazetted on 7 March 2008.

Footnotes

Royal Air Force airmen
Recipients of the Military Cross
People from Spalding, Lincolnshire
Royal Air Force personnel of the Iraq War
Living people
Year of birth missing (living people)